Sarah Grosvenor (1723–1742) was involved in a colonial court hearing after an unsuccessful abortion resulted in her death. After a seemingly successful surgical abortion performed by Dr. John Hallowell, Grosvenor became sick.

She died on September 14, 1742, in her hometown of Pomfret, Connecticut, after surgical complications. Grosvenor's case has been argued as one of the most well known surgical abortion cases in colonial America.

Early life and romantic relationship
Sarah Grosvenor was the daughter of Mary and Leicester Grosvenor. Her family owned farmland, and her father held a high position within the local offices. Grosvenor developed a secret relationship at age 19 with 27-year-old Amasa Sessions. Both came from valued families within their village, indicating that had they married, their marriage would have been accepted by both families.

Pregnancy and termination
Grosvenor became pregnant from sex with Amasa. After coercion, she eventually began "taking the trade", an abortifacient, in an attempt to abort the fetus. Abortifacients were common in colonial America and were considered an acceptable method of aborting a fetus in the early stages of pregnancy. Only when quickening occurred did it become unacceptable for a mother to abort the fetus, as this was when both the court and the church identified a fetus as a living individual. Some argue that Grosvenor primarily attempted to abort the fetus due to Amasa's lack of interest in her as a potential bride. The abortifacient did not succeed, so Amasa enlisted Dr. John Hallowell to perform a surgical abortion. Two days later, Grosvenor had a miscarriage. Ten days after the operation, she became sick and died, most likely from infection due to the use of dirty tools in an unsanitary environment.

Court hearing
Three years after Grosvenor's death, her case was taken to court. Historians believe the incident came to the attention of the court after years of gossip and rumors. Sarah's sister Zerviah and Sarah's friend Abigail Nightingale testified in court, recounting what Grosvenor had confessed to both of them separately from her death bed. The court identified her physician, John Hallowell, and her lover, Amasa Sessions, as responsible for her murder. The court charged the individuals for both putting Sarah into bad health and the attempted abortion, as it was done in an attempt to conceal her pregnancy. The court hearing ended in Amasa's innocence and the conviction of Hallowell with a misdemeanor. The court case did not acknowledge Grosvenor's abortion as murder of the fetus, even though Zerviah had testified that Grosvenor had felt the child move from within her. It has been understood by historians that Amasa was deemed innocent as he had lost his lover and had not performed the operation that resulted in her death.

See also
Abortion in the United States
Abortifacient

References

Sources
 "The New England Historical and Genealogical Register." Google Books. New England Historic Genealogical Society, n.d. Web. a.d. 13 Sept. 2016.
 Smith, Merril D. Women's Roles in Eighteenth-Century America. Santa Barbara, CA:  Greenwood, 2010. Print. a.d. 13 Sept. 2016
 Dayton, Cornelia Hughes. "Taking the Trade: Abortion and Gender Relations in  Eighteenth-Century New England Village." The William and Mary Quarterly 48.1  (1991): 19-49. Web. a.d. 13 Sept. 2016
 Breslaw, Elaine G. "Giving Birth." Lotions, Potions, Pills, and Magic: Health Care in Early America. NYU, 2012. 113-34. Web. a.d. 13 Sept. 2016
 Cheu, Maggie. "Now and Then: How Coverture Ideology Informs the Rhetoric of Abortion." Texas Journal of Women and the Law 22.1 (2012): 113-30. ProQuest. Web. a.d. 13 Sept. 2016
 Doan, Alesha E. Opposition & Intimidation: The Abortion Wars & Strategies of Political  Harassment. N.p.: U of Michigan, 2007. Print. a.d. 13 Sept. 2016

External links
Taking the Trade

1723 births
1742 deaths
People from Pomfret, Connecticut
Abortion in the United States
People of colonial Connecticut